Scarborough Borough Council in North Yorkshire, England is elected once every four years.

Political control
Since the foundation of the council in 1973 political control of the council has been held by the following parties:

Leadership
Political leadership is provided by the leader of the council, with the role of mayor being largely ceremonial in Scarborough. The leaders of the council since 1979 have been:

Council elections
1973 Scarborough Borough Council election
1976 Scarborough Borough Council election
1979 Scarborough Borough Council election (New ward boundaries)
1983 Scarborough Borough Council election
1987 Scarborough Borough Council election
1991 Scarborough Borough Council election
1995 Scarborough Borough Council election
1999 Scarborough Borough Council election
2003 Scarborough Borough Council election (New ward boundaries increased the number of seats by 1)
2007 Scarborough Borough Council election
2011 Scarborough Borough Council election
2015 Scarborough Borough Council election
2019 Scarborough Borough Council election

By-election results

1999-2003

2003-2007

2007-2011

2011-2015

2015-2019

2019-2023

References

By-election results

External links
Scarborough Borough Council

 
Politics of the Borough of Scarborough
Council elections in North Yorkshire
District council elections in England